Acrocercops loxias is a moth of the family Gracillariidae. It is known from India (Rajasthan) and Madagascar.

The larvae feed on Cleistocalyx operculatus, Eugenia cumini and Eugenia jambolana. They probably mine the leaves of their host plant.

References

loxias
Moths described in 1918
Moths of Madagascar
Moths of Asia